Tatu Valdemar Varmanen (born 9 July 1998) is a Sweden-born Finnish footballer who plays for Swedish club Östers IF. Varmanen was born in Sundbyberg, Sweden. He began his senior club career playing for Brommapojkarna, before signing with Inter Turku at age 18 in 2017.

Club career

Brommapojkarna
A product of Brommapojkarna's youth academy, Varmanen made his league debut for the club on 17 April 2016 in a 2-0 home victory over Piteå, coming on as an 80th minute substitute for Nemrut Awrohum.

Inter Turku
In March 2017, Varmanen moved to Veikkausliiga side Inter Turku, before being sent on loan to JJK. He made his league debut for the club on 4 August 2017 in a 3-0 home victory over HIFK.

TPS
In March 2019, Varmanen signed with Ykkönen club TPS on a one-year deal. After making his debut on matchday one against MYPA, Varmanen would make 20 appearances in all competitions for the club in 2019 as TPS gained promotion to the Veikkausliiga. In October, he signed a one-year contract extension.

Östers IF
Following four seasons in Finland, Varmanen returned to his native Sweden, signing with Östers IF. He made his debut for Öster on 11 April 2021 playing full 90 minutes in a match against Örgryte.

International career
Varmanen has represented both Finland U-18 and Finland U-19.

Honours
Inter Turku
Finnish Cup: 2017–18

References

External links

 Östers IF official profile
 Tatu Varmanen – SPL competition record  
 

1998 births
Living people
Finnish footballers
Finnish expatriate footballers
Finland youth international footballers
IF Brommapojkarna players
FC Inter Turku players
JJK Jyväskylä players
Turun Palloseura footballers
Östers IF players
Veikkausliiga players
Ykkönen players
Ettan Fotboll players
Association football defenders
Finnish expatriate sportspeople in Sweden
Expatriate footballers in Sweden